David John McComas (born May 22, 1958) is an American space plasma physicist, Vice President for Princeton Plasma Physics Laboratory, and Professor of Astrophysical Sciences and leads the Space Physics at Princeton Group at Princeton University. He had been Assistant Vice President for Space Science and Engineering at the Southwest Research Institute, Adjoint Professor of Physics at the University of Texas at San Antonio (UTSA), and was the founding director of the Center for Space Science and Exploration at Los Alamos National Laboratory.  He is noted for his extensive accomplishments in experimental space plasma physics, including leading instruments and missions to study the heliosphere and solar wind: IMAP, IBEX, TWINS, Ulysses/SWOOPS, ACE/SWEPAM, and Parker Solar Probe.  He received the 2014 COSPAR Space Science Award and the NASA Exceptional Public Service Medal.

Biography

McComas was born in Milwaukee, Wisconsin.  His father, Harold McComas, was a World War II Veteran, who went to college and law school through the GI Bill. His mother, Hazelyn McComas, nee Melconian, was the descendant of Armenian/Lebanese refugees who fled the genocide from Beirut to Ellis Island.  McComas is severely dyslexic, and didn’t start to learn how to read until the 4th grade. He discussed his dyslexia in childhood and how it led him to space science in a 2014 talk entitled “A Personal Journey from “Slow” to the interstellar Frontier.” McComas received his undergraduate degree in Physics from Massachusetts Institute of Technology in 1980, and his M.S. and Ph.D. in Geophysics and Space Physics from University of California, Los Angeles in 1985 and 1986.  He began his space physics career in 1980 with early development work on the SWOOPS instrument for Ulysses, at the Los Alamos National Laboratory.  He moved to SwRI, in San Antonio, Texas, in 2000 and Princeton University in 2016.

McComas holds seven patents and is author of over 730 scientific and technical papers in the refereed literature, spanning topics in heliospheric, magnetospheric, solar, and planetary science as well as space instrumentation and mission development. Together these have garnered over 40,000 citations.

Space missions

McComas is Principal Investigator of NASA's Interstellar Mapping and Acceleration Probe and Acceleration Probe (IMAP), Interstellar Boundary Explorer (IBEX) and TWINS (Two Wide-Angle Imaging Neutral-atom Spectrometers) missions, as well as the Parker Solar Probe – Integrated Science Investigation of the Sun instrument suite (ISOIS), and the Ulysses Solar Wind Plasma Investigation (SWOOPS) instrument. He is lead co-investigator for the Advanced Composition Explorer (ACE) Solar Wind Electron, Proton, Alpha Monitor (SWEPAM), and Solar Wind Around Pluto (SWAP) instrument on New Horizons.

McComas is also co-investigator on the JUNO mission and led the design and development of the Jovian Auroral Distribution Experiment (JADE) Instrument and is co-investigator on the Magnetospheric Multiscale Mission (MMS), Cassini-Huygens Plasma Spectrometer  (CAPS), GENESIS discovery mission, POLAR Thermal Ion Dynamics Experiment (TIDE), and IMAGE Midsized Explorer. At Los Alamos he was also Principal Investigator for a series of Magnetospheric Plasma Analyzers (MPAs) in geosynchronous orbit.

Boards and advisory committees

McComas serves on the National Academies's Space Science Board (SSB) and Committee on Increasing Diversity and Inclusion in the Leadership of Competed Space Missions.  He also serves on the Brookhaven National Laboratory (BNL) Science Associates Board of Directors. He was previously a member of the NASA Advisory Council (NAC 2013 - 2015) and served and then chaired  the NAC Science Committee (2010 - 2015). He chaired NASA's Solar Probe Science and Technology Definition Team (2003 -2008), NASA's Sun-Earth Connections Advisory Subcommittee (SECAS) 2000–2003, and J. Robert Oppenheimer Memorial Committee
(1997-1999).

McComas also previously served on the advisory committee for the Scobee Education Center at San Antonio College and on the board of directors of the J. Robert Oppenheimer Memorial Committee and of the Dyslexic Advantage, a non-profit focused on the strengths of the dyslexic mind.

Awards and honors

 Recipient of the Arctowski Medal for pioneering contributions to experimental space plasma physics (2023)
 Recipient of the EGU Hannes Alfvén Medal for plasma physics research (2022)
Recipient of the NASA Exceptional Public Service Medal (2015)
 Recipient of the 2014 COSPAR Space Science Award
 Recipient of the 2012 Adler Planetarium Outstanding Science Education Partner of the Year Award
 Fellow (2010) American Physical Society
 Fellow (2007) American Association for the Advancement of Science
 Recipient of the 1993 American Geophysical Union James B. Macelwane Medal
 Fellow (1993) American Geophysical Union
 Recipient of 19 NASA Group Achievement Awards
 Asteroid 172090 Davidmccomas, named after him in 2018

References

1958 births
Living people
Scientists from Milwaukee
MIT Department of Physics alumni
University of California, Los Angeles alumni
UCLA Department of Earth Planetary and Space Sciences alumni
21st-century American physicists